Pål Nyrén (born 1955) is a biochemistry professor at the Royal Institute of Technology (KTH), Stockholm. He is most famous for developing the pyrosequencing method for DNA sequencing.

Career
1999 Professor in Biochemistry, KTH, Stockholm
1997 Founder of the company Biotage AB (former Pyrosequencing AB)
1988 Associate professor (Docent) Biochemistry, University of Stockholm
1985-86 Postdoc at LMB, MRC, Cambridge, G.B. with prof John Walker
1985 PhD (Tekn. Doktor) Biochemistry, University of Stockholm (Thesis title: "The proton pumping pyrophosphatase from Rhodospirillum rubrum")
1981 MSc (Civ. ing.) Chemical Engineering, KTH, Stockholm

Recognition
2013 winner of the European Inventor Award in the SMEs category awarded by the European Patent Office

References

1955 births
Living people
Swedish chemists
Academic staff of the KTH Royal Institute of Technology
KTH Royal Institute of Technology alumni
Stockholm University alumni